Alva Hugh Maddox (April 17, 1930 – December 11, 2020) was an American jurist who served as a justice of the Supreme Court of Alabama from 1969 to 2001.

Biography 
Born in Covington County, Alabama to parents Christopher Columbus and Audie L. (née Freeman) Maddox, he attended the University of Alabama, graduating in 1952 and receiving his J.D. degree from its law school in 1957. He served in the Korean War, and retired from the Air Force Reserve in 1982 as a colonel after 30 years of service.

Maddox was admitted to the bar in 1957 and clerked for the Alabama Court of Civil Appeals. The following year, he was a law clerk for the U.S. District Court of Alabama. In 1959, he started working as an attorney in Montgomery. From 1961 to 1963, he served as a circuit judge for the 15th Judicial Circuit, after which term he served as legal adviser to Governor George Wallace in 1965, Governor Lurleen Wallace in 1967, and Governor Albert Brewer in 1968. Brewer appointed Maddox as an associate justice of the Supreme Court of Alabama on September 23, 1969 to a newly created seat, and was sworn in on October 1, 1969. He served until his retirement as a senior associate justice on January 15, 2001. During his 31 years on the court, he wrote 1,650 majority opinions, and he is the longest-serving Associate Justice of the Alabama Supreme Court, having been elected five times following his appointment. He authored the treatise Alabama Rules of Criminal Procedure, which is featured in two scenes in the film My Cousin Vinny.

On June 14, 1958, he married Virginia Roberts, and they had two children. He died on December 11, 2020 in Montgomery, Alabama.

Electoral history

References 

Justices of the Supreme Court of Alabama
1930 births
2020 deaths
Alabama Democrats
People from Covington County, Alabama
University of Alabama alumni
20th-century American judges
21st-century American judges